Frederick Carl Forsberg (July 4, 1944 – January 26, 2021) was an American professional football player who played linebacker for six seasons for the Denver Broncos (#52), the Buffalo Bills, and the San Diego Chargers. Previously, he played for the Calgary Stampeders of the Canadian Football League in 1966 and the Victoria Steelers of the Continental Football League in 1967.

External links

References

1944 births
2021 deaths
Players of American football from Tacoma, Washington
American football linebackers
Canadian football linebackers
Washington Huskies football players
Denver Broncos (AFL) players
Denver Broncos players
Buffalo Bills players
San Diego Chargers players
Calgary Stampeders players
Continental Football League players